That's What She Said is the third EP by The Friday Night Boys. It was released on October 14, 2008 with Fueled By Ramen and produced by Sean Small.

Track listing

2008 EPs
The Friday Night Boys albums
Fueled by Ramen EPs